The 2018 USC Trojans football team represented the University of Southern California in the 2018 NCAA Division I FBS football season. They played their home games at the Los Angeles Memorial Coliseum and competed as members of the South Division of the Pac-12 Conference. They were led by third-year head coach Clay Helton.

Despite being ranked No. 15 in the AP Poll's preseason rankings, the Trojans finished the season 5–7, the program's first losing record since 2000. USC lost to both of its major rivals, UCLA and Notre Dame, in the same season for the first time since 2013, and it also lost to all other California Pac-12 schools (UCLA, California, and Stanford) in the same season for the first time since 1996. The team went 4–5 in Pac-12 play, tying Arizona for third place in the Pac-12 South Division.

On November 25, USC athletic director Lynn Swann announced that head coach Clay Helton would return in 2019 despite the disappointing season.

Previous season
The Trojans finished the 2017 season 11–3, 8–1 in Pac-12 play to be champions of the South Division. They represented the South Division in the Pac-12 Championship Game where they defeated Stanford to become Pac-12 Champions. They were invited to play in the Cotton Bowl where they lost 7–24 to Ohio State.

Personnel

Coaching staff

Roster

Returning starters

USC returns 31 starters in 2018, including 11 on offense, 13 on defense, and 5 on special teams.

Key departures include Sam Darnold (QB – 14 games), Ronald Jones II (TB – 13 games), Deontay Burnett (WR – 12 games), Steven Mitchell (WR – 7 games), Jalen Greene (WR – 5 games), Viane Talamaivao (OG – 5 games), Nico Falah (C – 14 games), Rasheem Green(DE/DT – 14 games), Josh Fatu (DT – 12 games), Uchenna Nwosu (OLB – 14 games), Jack Jones (CB – 13 games), Chris Hawkins (S – 14 games), Ykili Ross (S – 2 games).

Other departures include James Toland IV (TB), Matt Lopes (S).

Offense (11)

Defense (13)

Special teams (5)

Transfers

The Trojans lost 5 players due to transfer.

Depth chart

 Depth Chart 2018

True Freshman
Double Position : *

Recruiting class

Scholarship distribution chart 

 /  / * Former walk-on

– 85 scholarships permitted, 81 currently allotted to players

– 78 recruited players on scholarship (Three former walk-ons)

– OT Jalen McKenzie took an advanced scholarship or "blueshirt" limiting USC's class of 2018 to 24.

Projecting Scholarship Distribution 2018

2018 NFL Draft

NFL Combine

The official list of participants for the 2018 NFL Combine included USC football players WR Deontay Burnett, QB Sam Darnold, DE Rasheem Green, RB Ronald Jones II, WR Steven Mitchell Jr. & OLB Uchenna Nwosu.

Team players drafted into the NFL

Schedule

Game summaries

UNLV

Stanford

Texas

Washington State

Arizona

Colorado

Utah

Arizona State

Oregon State

California

UCLA

Notre Dame

Rankings

Statistics

Preseason

Pac-12 Media Days
Pac-12 media days are set for July 25, 2018 in Hollywood, California. Clay Helton (Head coach), Porter Gustin (OLB) & Cameron Smith (ILB) at Pac-12 media days. The Pac-12 media poll was released with the Trojans predicted to win the Pac-12 South division title.

Awards and honors

Awards and honors

Midseason award watch lists

Weekly awards

Major award semifinalists

Honors and Awards Source: 2018 Arizona Media Notes

Players drafted into the NFL

Notes
 November 16, 2017 – USC's 2018 Football Schedule Announced.
 December 1, 2017 – No. 10 USC Beats No. 12 Stanford, 31–28 for Pac-12 Title.
 December 20, 2017 – USC Football Announces Early Signing Period 2018 Class.
 December 22, 2017 – Juco Defensive Lineman Caleb Tremblay Signs With USC.
 December 22, 2017 – No. 1 2019 QB recruit JT Daniels skipping senior year and enrolling at USC a year early.
 December 29, 2017 – No. 5 Ohio State Tops No. 8 USC 24–7 in Cotton Bowl Classic.
 December 29, 2017 – Defensive Back Talanoa Hufanga Signs With USC Football.
 January 3, 2018 – Sam Darnold Declares for 2018 NFL Draft.
 January 5, 2018 – USC Tailback Ronald Jones II Declares for NFL.
 January 5, 2018 – Porter Gustin reportedly set to return to USC Football for 2018 season.
 January 6, 2018 – Amon-Ra St. Brown commits to USC over Stanford, Notre Dame.
 January 8, 2018 – USC WR Deontay Burnett declares for 2018 NFL Draft.
 January 10, 2018 – Toa Lobendahn to return to USC Football for 2018 season.
 January 10, 2018 – Cameron Smith announces return to USC Football for 2018.
 January 11, 2018 – USC Football reportedly promote Bryan Ellis to quarterbacks coach.
 January 12, 2018 – Deland McCullough leaves USC Football for Kansas City Chiefs.
 January 12, 2018 – USC DB Iman Marshall will return to USC for the 2018 season.
 January 13, 2018 – USC DL Rasheem Green Declares for 2018 NFL Draft.
 January 18, 2018 – Ronnie Lott added to College Football Playoff Selection Committee.
 January 19, 2018 – Keary Colbert reportedly promoted to tight ends coach for USC Football.
 January 20, 2018 – Tee Martin gets multi-year extension to stay with USC Football.

References

USC
USC Trojans football seasons
USC Trojans football
USC Trojans football